Erich Maas (born 24 December 1940) is a German former footballer who played as a striker. He spent eight seasons in the Bundesliga, as well as five seasons in the French Division 1, and was capped three times for the West Germany national team.

Honours 
Eintracht Braunschweig
 Bundesliga: 1966–67

Nantes
 French Division 1: 1972–73
 Coupe de France runner-up: 1972–73

References

External links 
 
 
 

1940 births
Living people
People from Prüm
People from the Rhine Province
German footballers
Footballers from Rhineland-Palatinate
Association football forwards
Germany international footballers
Bundesliga players
Ligue 1 players
1. FC Saarbrücken players
Eintracht Braunschweig players
FC Bayern Munich footballers
FC Nantes players
FC Rouen players
Paris FC players
German expatriate footballers
German expatriate sportspeople in France
Expatriate footballers in France